PacWest Racing was a Champ Car racing team owned by Bruce McCaw founded in 1993.

The team's first full-time season was the next year, 1994, with drivers Dominic Dobson and future Indy Racing League co-champion Scott Sharp. In 1995, the team switched to former Formula One driver Maurício Gugelmin and a fading Danny Sullivan, who would be replaced late in the season by Juan Manuel Fangio II after an injury. In 1996, Mark Blundell took over Fangio's seat.

1997 became PacWest's breakout year, with the team taking four wins - three from Blundell and Gugelmin's sole CART victory at Vancouver. The team was since considered a major team, and was figured to be in contention for the championship in 1998.

The next three years, however, turned out to be a disappointment. 2001 saw Blundell, who retired after the previous season's end, replaced with 2000 Indy Lights Champion Scott Dixon, who earned PacWest's final victory at Nazareth, in which Dixon's teammate Gugelmin withdrew after the death of his son.

2002 was PacWest's final year, in which the troubled team could only obtain associate sponsorship from NTN. The team started four races with Dixon and Oriol Servia. After the third race, Dixon left the team to join Chip Ganassi Racing, and Servia started one more race before McCaw closed the organization.

The team was purchased by Kevin Kalkhoven and Craig Pollock to form PK Racing. The team operated as KV Racing Technology from 2003 until the end of the 2016 season.

The PacWest team's two cars were the cars used by main characters Jimmy Bly (#18) and Joe Tanto (#17) in the 2001 action movie Driven.

Past drivers
 Mark Blundell (1996–2000)
 Scott Dixon (2001–2002)
 Dominic Dobson (1993–1994)
 Teo Fabi (1996)
 Juan Manuel Fangio II (1995)
 Maurício Gugelmin (1995–2001)
 Roberto Moreno (1999)
 Oriol Servia (2002)
 Scott Sharp (1994)
 Danny Sullivan (1995)

Racing results

Complete CART FedEx Championship Series results
(key) (results in bold indicate pole position) (results in italics indicate fastest lap)

Sources 

Champ Car teams
American auto racing teams
Indy Lights teams
Auto racing teams established in 1993
Auto racing teams disestablished in 2003